The 1949 Belgian motorcycle Grand Prix was the fourth round of the 1949 Grand Prix motorcycle racing season. It took place at the Circuit de Spa-Francorchamps.

British rider Bill Doran won the 500cc race riding his AJS from Arciso Artesiani and Enrico Lorenzetti.

By winning their second race of the 600 cc Sidecar of the season British Norton rider Eric Oliver and his swinger Denis Jenkinson wrapped up the first Sidecar championship before the third and final round to be held at the Nations Grand Prix. In the same race, Belgian sidecar rider Edouard Bruylant and his British swinger known as "Hurst" were killed.

500 cc classification

350 cc classification

Sidecar Classification

References

Belgian motorcycle Grand Prix
Belgian
Motorcycle Grand Prix
Belgian Motorcycle Grand Prix